Aandavan Kattalai is a 2016 Indian Tamil-language satirical film co-written and directed by M. Manikandan. The film stars Vijay Sethupathi and Ritika Singh, with Pooja Devariya, Nassar and Yogi Babu amongst others in supporting roles. Produced by G. N. Anbu Chezhiyan and featuring music by K, the film began production in March 2016 and was released on 23 September 2016.

Narrating the story of how two men from interior Tamil Nadu struggle to acquire travel documents to fly to London, Aandavan Kattalai opened to widespread critical acclaim and became a huge commercial success. The film has been remade in Telugu as London Babulu (2017). It was dubbed in Hindi as Pappu Passport by Goldmines Telefilms on 10 February 2020. In 2022, Vignesh Shivan and Nayanthara announced the Gujarati remake titled Shubh Yatra starring Malhar Thakar and Monal Gajjar under their production house Rowdy Pictures.

Plot
Faced with several debts, a village accountant Gandhi Arumugam leaves his village near Madurai to head to Chennai with his best friend Muthupandi Selvam alias Pandi to get all the documents necessary for going to London, where they plan to make money to pay off their debts. They approach two middlemen to help them get the passport and British tourist visa necessary for them to go to London. The middlemen claim that the British Deputy High Commission would prefer to give tourist visas to those who are already married, so the duo are forced to add their "wife's" name while applying for the passport, with Gandhi adding his "wife's" name as Karmeghakuzhali, following a suggestion from their real estate broker, Murugesan. However, Gandhi's visa application is rejected, forcing him to remain in Chennai and take up a job as an accountant with a drama troupe Stray Factory, run by Master, while Pandi passes his visa interview and leaves for London with the help of a passport officer, Kumar.

With his hard work and sincerity, Gandhi soon becomes the favorite employee of Master and is made to act in his plays. Eventually, Stray Factory are invited to perform in London, leaving Gandhi in a bind as he now needs to get his "wife's" name removed from his passport. He finds out that the only way to do so is to divorce his "wife", but for that he needs to find a woman who has the name Karmeghakuzhali. He successfully manages to track down a woman with the name Karmeghakuzhali, who is a television journalist, and tries to convince her to act as his wife and "divorce" him. He also feigns muteness. Initially she refuses, but she soon gives Gandhi the necessary documents to "divorce" her, pitying him. However, since both husband and wife need to be present at court at the time of divorce, Gandhi convinces Aarthi, an actress who works in Stray Factory, to act as Karmeghakuzhali at the court. But at the time of the divorce hearing, Aarthi disappears to the toilet, forcing a reluctant Karmeghakuzhali, who is present at the court, to take part in the divorce hearing. The subsequent events at the divorce hearing prove humiliating for Karmeghakuzhali, also she learns that Gandhi's muteness is feigned. Hence she leaves the court in tears with no "divorce" granted.

Later, Gandhi finds out that Pandi was deported upon arrival in London by immigration officials for giving false information and address verification while obtaining his passport, and he too finds himself in the dock for doing the same. However, he shows his and Pandi's original Voter ID cards to the immigration officials, getting them released, while the middlemen are arrested. Pandi reveals that he was sent to Sri Lanka and tortured by prison officials after he had tried to seek asylum in London as a Sri Lankan refugee, and humiliated by the recent events, he returns to his village.

Gandhi goes to the Regional Passport Office in Chennai and admits his crime to the Regional Passport Officer. But in a last-minute decision, Gandhi chooses not to remove Karmeghakuzhali's name from his passport and instead proposes marriage to Karmeghakuzhali, who is initially taken aback, but agrees. He soon obtains a  British visa and leaves for London with the rest of the Stray Factory troupe.

Cast

 Vijay Sethupathi as Gandhi Arumugam
 Ritika Singh as Karmeghakuzhali
 Pooja Devariya as Aarthi
 Nassar as Master
 Yogi Babu as Muthupandi Selvam
 A. Venkatesh as Gandhi's brother-in-law
 Singampuli as Murugesan
 S. S. Stanley as Kumar
 George Maryan as Senior lawyer
 Vinodhini Vaidyanathan as Junior lawyer
 Ramesh Thilak as Passport Broker
 Hareesh Peradi as Deportation Officer
 Cheenu Mohan as Passport Official
 R. N. R. Manohar as Minister
 Namo Narayanan as Viji
 Sushila Natraj as Judge Shantha Kumari
 Vazhakku En Muthuraman as Regional Passport Officer
 Aravindhan as Nesan
 TSR
 Carl A. Harte as Visa Officer

Production
Following the release of Kaaka Muttai (2015), Manikandan revealed in July 2015 that he would direct Vijay Sethupathi in a film to be produced by G. N. Anbu Chazhiyan of Gopuram Films. Manikandan and Vijay Sethupathi had known each other before they entered the Tamil film industry and had regularly collaborated for independent short films. The start of the shoot was delayed to allow Vijay Sethupathi to complete his ongoing projects, while Manikandan moved on to finish work on Kuttrame Thandanai (2016). Before the end of 2015, the makers announced that the film would be titled as Aandavan Kattalai and that composer K would work on the film's score and soundtrack. Manikandan stated it would be based in Chennai and would be a "realistic dark comedy" with a "quirky" subject. Prior to release, it was revealed that the film would narrate the people's craze of trying to get settled in foreign country and taking bureaucratic shortcuts to achieve their goal. Actress Ritika Singh was signed on to portray the leading female role of a journalist, only a month after the release of her first film Irudhi Suttru (2016). An ensemble cast of actors including Pooja Devariya, Nassar, Singampuli and Yogi Babu also joined the team, before production began.

The film began production in early March 2016 at Kilpauk, Chennai and progressed swiftly throughout the city. The final schedule was shot in a studio resembling an embassy in Chennai during May 2016. The shoot of the film and dubbing work was completed by July 2016.

Soundtrack

The music of Aandavan Kattalai'''s was composed by K. The soundtrack album features nine tracks, sung by  Benny Dayal, Anthony Daasan, Janani S. V. and K himself; while all lyrics were written by Gnanakaravel, Vivek Velmurugan, Darwin Guna. The album was released on 12 September 2016. Behindwoods.com gave the album a rating of 2.75/5 stating "Aandavan Kattalai is a brilliant album from K who gives the best of various genres in a perfect package".

Release
The film was theatrically released on 23 September 2016 by distributors, Sri Green Productions. The film had a lower profile release that Prabhu Solomon's Dhanush-starrer Thodari (2016), which released on the same day, but by the first weekend, it had overtaken it in collections and also replaced its shows in several cinema halls. The film subsequently went on to become a profitable venture for the producers. The satellite rights of the film were sold to Sun TV.

Upon release, the film received critically acclaimed reviews from film critics and audiences. Baradwaj Rangan of the Hindu gave "Aandavan Kattalai a positive reviews and noted that it was "yet another marvellous comedy of desperation from Manikandan". He added that "Manikandan and his writing team (Arul Chezhiyan, Anucharan) should hold classes for other Tamil filmmakers who want the story-screenplay-dialogue credit but reveal little understanding of these elements" as "everything in Aandavan Kattalai is there for a reason". Times of India wrote "Just like how Manikandan's Kaaka Muttai and Kutramme Thandanai refrained from finger-pointing and sermonising, Aandavan Kattalai, too, is far from being preachy, despite involving a subject that offer plenty of targets to take pot-shots at" and gave the film a high rating of three-and-a-half out of five stars. Firstpost wrote "Aandavan Kattalai works largely due to its script and the situational comedy in the narration" and "the way the story unfolds and the difficult situations the hero faces is so well brought out, without taking any cinematic liberties". Similarly, Deccan Chronicle called it "a film that's not to be missed", while Indiaglitz.com called it a "gem". Likewise, Sify.com stated "Aandavan Kattalai'' is a must watch for all the ardent movie buffs" and Rediff.com added "the director once again delivers big time with a refreshing screenplay loaded with reality and fun, some great music, delightful characters and brilliant all-round performances". Rediff gave it 4 out of 5 stating that "it is not to be missed".

References

External links
 

2016 films
2010s Tamil-language films
Indian comedy-drama films
Films about illegal immigration to Europe
Films scored by K (composer)
Films about theatre
Indian satirical films
Tamil films remade in other languages
2010s satirical films
2016 comedy-drama films
Films directed by M. Manikandan